The Laguna Fire, previously known as the Kitchen Creek Fire and the Boulder Oaks Fire, was a 175,425-acre wildfire that burned from September 22 to October 4, 1970, in the Laguna Mountains and East County region of San Diego County in Southern California.

It was the third-largest wildfire in the history of California at that time, after the Santiago Canyon Fire of 1889, and the Matilija Fire of 1932. It was one of many wildfires in a massive conflagration that spanned across the state from September 22 to October 4, 1970. The Laguna Fire of 1970 caused at least $234 million (1970 USD) in damages, including $5.6 million of damage to residential property.

History
The Laguna fire was started by downed power lines during Santa Ana winds in the Kitchen Creek area of the Laguna Mountains on the morning of September 26, 1970. The fire devastated the communities of Harbison Canyon and Crest. In the end, the fire burned  and 382 homes, killing 16 people, before it was contained on October 4, 1970.

The Laguna Fire was surpassed as the third-largest fire in California history by the  Cedar Fire in October 2003. It was surpassed as the fourth-largest by the  Witch Creek Fire in October 2007.

Aerial firefighting issue
At a time when high Santa Ana winds grounded other firefighting aircraft, a representative of Canadair brought a CL-215 to southern California to demonstrate its capabilities in aerial firefighting. He was turned away by firefighting officials. Nevertheless, while other firefighting aircraft were unable to fly safely he operated his "Super Scooper" out of El Capitan Reservoir and dropped water on the Laguna Fire wherever he saw fit.

The firefighting officials were unimpressed, and such aircraft were not used again in Southern California to fight fires until the San Bernardino National Forest used one in 2013 to fight the Lytle Fire, when other aircraft were grounded. With the exception of two CL-415s leased by Los Angeles County during the fire season, the CL-215 and CL-415 are rarely used.

Wildfire suppression changes
In the wake of the fire, some wildfire suppression policies were changed. Congress directed the establishment of the Modular Airborne FireFighting System (MAFFS) which would allow military transport aircraft to be able to respond to wildfires if the commercial air tankers are unavailable or committed elsewhere.

Retardant is generally ineffective when dropped from air where winds are blowing down a hill (foehn wind event) from 45–70 mph. The retardant gets intermixed with the wind and is dispersed, thus it never reaches its intended target. This makes Southern California unique when fighting fires from the sky, during a Santa Ana wind event.

See also

 List of California wildfires

References

External links
 
 Southern California's Worst Brush Fires

Wildfires in San Diego County, California
1970 fires in the United States
1970 in California
1970s wildfires in the United States
Laguna Mountains
East County (San Diego County)
1970 natural disasters in the United States